Lollapalooza is a short piece composed by American minimalist composer John Adams in 1995. The piece is based on the rhythm of the word 'Lollapalooza'. It was composed as a fortieth birthday present to the British conductor Simon Rattle, with whom Adams has worked in the past.

It was first performed November 10, 1995 by the City of Birmingham Symphony Orchestra, with Rattle conducting.

John Adams on Lollapalooza

Recordings 

 New World Symphony, Michael Tilson Thomas, cond., BMG/RCA 68798
 Hallé Orchestra, Kent Nagano, cond., Nonesuch Records 79607-2

Orchestration  
Piccolo, 2 flutes (2nd doubling piccolo) 2 oboes, English horn, E-flat clarinet, 2 clarinets, bass clarinet, 3 bassoons, contrabassoon, 4 horns, 3 trumpets, 2 tenor trombones, bass trombone, tuba, timpani, percussion, piano, strings. The percussion is divided among four players:

Player 1: xylophone, 3 large roto-toms, suspended cymbal, small tam-tam
Player 2: snare drum (for rim shot only), pedal bass drum, maracas, tambourine, claves
Player 3: claves, woodblock, bongo, snare drum, low floor tom
Player 4: vibraphone, large bass drum

References

See also
"Garryowen" (air)

Compositions by John Adams (composer)
1995 compositions
Compositions for symphony orchestra